The Amazing Race 27 is the twenty-seventh season of the American reality television show The Amazing Race. It featured eleven teams of two competing in a race around the world.

The season premiered on CBS September 25, 2015, and the finale aired on December 11, 2015.

Dating news reporters Kelsey Gerckens and Joey Buttitta of KEYT-TV were the winners of this season, while engaged couple Justin Scheman and Diana Bishop finished in second place, and dating paparazzi Logan Fazio and Chris Gordon finished in third.

Production

Development and filming
 
Similar to The Amazing Race 25, the show's Twitter page announced an open start at Venice Beach in Los Angeles, California, and invited fans to join in sending the new teams off on June 22, 2015. The open start revealed that teams would first head to Rio de Janeiro, Brazil.

Marketing
Although Fitbit and Travelocity continued sponsoring the show, Ford discontinued their sponsorship for this season.

Cast
The cast included TMZ editor Kelly Berning and post production supervisor Shevonne Sullivan, former New York Jets cheerleaders Tiffany Torres and Krista DeBono, former America's Best Dance Crew contestants Ernest "E-Knock" Phillips and Jayjion "Jin Lao" Greer, Justin Scheman and Diana Bishop, who were known for their viral Amazing Race proposal video, and reporters Kelsey Gerckens and Joey Buttitta from KEYT-TV.

Future appearances
After the season aired, Kelsey & Joey got engaged during their interview on Home and Family, and eventually married on August 25, 2017. On January 22, 2020, they both appeared on an episode of CBS's Let's Make a Deal while Kelsey was pregnant with their son.

On May 25, 2016, Kelsey & Joey and Tiffany & Krista appeared on an Amazing Race-themed primetime special episode of The Price is Right.

On November 1, 2017, Krista DeBono appeared as the pit stop greeter for Leg 2 of HaMerotz LaMillion 6, the Israeli version of The Amazing Race, at Times Square in New York City.

Justin & Diana appeared on season 30 in attendance at the starting line.

On March 1, 2020, Alex Manard appeared on an episode of Discovery Channel's Naked and Afraid and lasted the full 21 days in the Amazon rainforest of Yasuni, Ecuador.

Results
The following teams are listed with their placements in each leg. Placements are listed in finishing order. 
A  placement with a dagger indicates that the team was eliminated. 
An  placement with a double-dagger indicates that the team was the last to arrive at a pit stop in a non-elimination leg, and had to perform a Speed Bump task in the following leg. 
An italicized and underlined placement indicates that the team was the last to arrive at a pit stop, but there was no rest period at the pit stop and all teams were instructed to continue racing. There was no required Speed Bump task in the next leg.
 A  indicates that the team used an Express Pass on that leg to bypass one of their tasks.
 A  indicates that the team used the U-Turn and a  indicates the team on the receiving end of the U-Turn.

Notes

Race summary

Leg 1 (United States → Brazil)

Episode 1: "A Little Too Much Beefcake" (September 25, 2015)
Prize: Express Pass (awarded to Tanner & Josh)
Eliminated: Kelly & Shevonne
Locations
Los Angeles, California (Venice Beach) (Starting Line)
 Marina del Rey (Mother's Beach → Burton Chace Park)
 Los Angeles → Rio de Janeiro, Brazil
 Rio de Janeiro (Lagoa Heliport → Urca Hill)
Rio de Janeiro (Clube São Conrado Free Flight) 
Rio de Janeiro (Copacabana Beach) 
Rio de Janeiro (Arpoador Lookout) 
Episode summary
From Venice Beach, teams had to travel by taxi to Mother's Beach, choose a water-bike, and then pedal it to Phil Keoghan in Burton Chace Park, where they received plane tickets to their first destination: Rio de Janeiro, Brazil. The first team to complete this task received the only tickets on the first flight via American Airlines, while all of the other teams departed a half-hour later on the second flight via Delta Air Lines. Once in Rio de Janeiro, teams had to pick a number and travel by helicopter to Urca Hill, flying past Christ the Redeemer en route. Once they landed, the heliport manager asked the teams the name of the monument they passed during the flight, and if teams answered correctly, they received their next clue.
 This season's first Detour on Copacabana Beach was a choice between Sand or Sidewalk. In Sand, teams had to play footvolley against local professional players, who could not use their hands while the teams could, and score six points before the pros scored eighteen, in order to receive their next clue. In Sidewalk, teams had to solve a giant geometric slide puzzle derived from the Portuguese pavement style of the Copacabana pavement in order to receive their next clue.
 In this season's only Fast Forward, one team would have had to ride a hang glider from Pedra Bonita and soar above the city. Due to windy weather conditions, no teams won the Fast Forward, since they did not want to wait until weather conditions might have improved.
Teams had to check in at the pit stop: Arpoador Lookout in Rio de Janeiro.
Additional notes
Kelly & Shevonne completed the Detour; however, they never made it to the pit stop. After all of the other teams had already checked in, Phil came to Copacabana Beach to inform them of their elimination.

Leg 2 (Brazil → Argentina)

Episode 2: "Get in There and Think Like a Dog" (October 2, 2015)
Prize: A trip for two to El Jadida, Morocco (awarded to Justin & Diana)
Eliminated: Alex & Adam
Locations
Rio de Janeiro (Arpoador Lookout) 
 Rio de Janeiro → Buenos Aires, Argentina
Buenos Aires (Basílica María Auxiliadora y San Carlos )
Buenos Aires (Palermo Neighborhood  Gabriel del Campo Antiques & Lezama Park) 
Buenos Aires (Bartolomé Mitre 4272 ) 
Buenos Aires (Campo Argentino de Polo) 
Episode summary
At the beginning of this leg, teams were instructed to fly to Buenos Aires, Argentina. Once in Buenos Aires, teams had to locate the church where Pope Francis was baptized, which teams had to figure out was the Basílica María Auxiliadora y San Carlos. The next morning, teams entered the church, one at a time in the order in which they arrived, where a priest gave them their next clue.
 This leg's Detour was a choice between Cartoneros or Fletero. In Cartoneros, teams traveled to the Palermo Neighborhood, where they had to select a cart, collect cardboard from recycling bins, and transport it to a truck to be weighed. Once they'd collected at least  of cardboard, teams received their next clue. In Fletero, teams traveled to Gabriel del Campo Antiques near Plaza Dorrego, picked up the pieces of a statue, and brought them to a truck. One team member sat in the front and give the driver directions, while the other held the pieces in the back until they reached the gazebo at Plaza Intendente Sebeer. At the park, teams had to properly reassemble the statute in order to receive their next clue.
 In this season's first Roadblock, one team member had to properly perform a tango routine, including a portion where they were harnessed and danced on the wall, in order to receive their next clue.
After completing the Roadblock, teams were instructed to go to "The Cathedral of Polo", which they had to figure out was the Campo Argentino de Polo in Buenos Aires.

Leg 3 (Argentina)

Episode 3: "Where My Dogs At?" (October 9, 2015)
Prize: A trip for two to Siem Reap, Cambodia (awarded to Tanner & Josh)
Eliminated: Ernest & Jin
Locations
Buenos Aires (Campo Argentino de Polo) 
 Buenos Aires → San Antonio de Areco
San Antonio de Areco (La Porteña) 
San Antonio de Areco (Plaza Principal)
San Antonio de Areco (Boliche de Bessonart & Riverside  La Cinacina Estancia) 
San Antonio de Areco (Parque Criollo y Museo Gauchesco Ricardo Güiraldes) 
Episode summary
At the beginning of this leg, teams were instructed to travel by bus to San Antonio de Areco. Once there, teams had to drive to La Porteña in order to find their next clue.
 In this leg's Roadblock, one team member had to properly hang two racks of lamb and one rack of beef ribs onto a set of metal grills to cook the meat asado-style, with the bones oriented in the correct direction and properly skewered on all sides, in order to receive their next clue.
After completing the Roadblock, teams had to deliver a roasted lamb to a festival at Plaza Principal in order to receive their next clue.
 This leg's Detour was a choice between Horse or Carriage. In Horse, teams had to pick a polo mallet from the plaza and walk to Boliche de Bessonart, where they changed into polo gear. They then had to walk to the riverside and pick out a fake horse that needed to be properly tacked and pushed back to the plaza. In Carriage, teams had to pick a buggy whip from the plaza and travel by foot to La Cinacina Estancia. There, they had to don gaucho clothing, clean a carriage, and then push it to a team of waiting horses. Once the horses were harnessed to the buggy, they had to ride back to the plaza. At the end of both Detours, teams had to present either the fake horse or the buggy whip to the judges in order to receive their next clue.
After completing the Detour, teams were instructed to travel by foot to the pit stop at the Parque Criollo y Museo Gauchesco Ricardo Güiraldes.

Leg 4 (Argentina → Zambia → Zimbabwe)

Episode 4: "Good Old Fashioned Spit in the Face" (October 16, 2015)
Locations
San Antonio de Areco (Plaza Principal) 
 San Antonio de Areco → Buenos Aires
 Buenos Aires → Livingstone, Zambia
Livingstone District (Mukuni Village)
Livingstone (Batoka Aerodrome) 
Mosi-oa-Tunya National Park (Victoria Falls – Knife's Edge Bridge)
Victoria Falls, Zimbabwe (Shoestrings Backpackers Lodge)
Victoria Falls (The Big Five Co-Op  Victoria Falls Hotel) 
Victoria Falls (Rose of Charity Orphanage)  
Episode summary
At the start of this leg, teams had to find a specific travel agency and pick up tickets for one of two flights to Livingstone, Zambia, each carrying four teams and arriving fifteen minutes apart. After arriving in Zambia, teams had to travel to Mukuni Village, where they took part in a traditional welcome ceremony before receiving their next clue.
 In this leg's Roadblock, one team member had to choose a microlight plane and fly above Victoria Falls in order to spot the route marker below the mist on the Knife's Edge Bridge. Once they landed, they could reunite with their partner and travel to the bridge, where they found their next clue. 
After completing the Roadblock, teams had to travel to the Shoestrings Backpackers Lodge in Victoria Falls, Zimbabwe, where they had to spend the night and pick one of three departure times the next morning.
 This leg's Detour was a choice between Co-Op or Croquet. In Co-Op, teams traveled to The Big Five Co-Op and had to stain and polish a carved wooden giraffe. Once it was properly painted and dried, they could receive their next clue. In Croquet, teams traveled to the Victoria Falls Hotel and had to play croquet, scoring five points against professional players, in order to receive their next clue.
Teams had to check in at the pit stop: the Rose of Charity Orphanage in Victoria Falls.
Additional notes
Tanner & Josh used their Express Pass to bypass the Roadblock on this leg, and then bequeathed the Express Pass to Denise & James Earl.
 Tiffany & Krista chose to use the U-Turn on Justin & Diana. However, Justin & Diana had already passed the U-Turn by that point and were therefore unaffected.
There was no elimination at the end of this leg; all teams were instead instructed to continue racing.

Leg 5 (Zimbabwe)

Episode 5: "King of the Jungle" (October 23, 2015)
Prize: A trip for two to Bratislava, Slovakia (awarded to Denise & James Earl)
Eliminated: Jazmine & Danielle
Locations
Victoria Falls (The Lookout Café)
Victoria Falls National Park (Batoka Gorge) 
Victoria Falls (Elephants Walk Shopping and Artist Village – Crocodile Cage Diving  A'Zambezi River Lodge) 
Victoria Falls (Masuwe Private Game Reserve – The Lion Encounter)
Victoria Falls (Masuwe Private Game Reserve – Masuwe Lodge) 
Episode summary
At the beginning of this leg, teams had to travel to The Lookout Café in order to find their next clue.
 This leg's Roadblock was a Switchback to the very first Detour from season 1. One team member had to strap on a harness and free-fall  into the Batoka Gorge and swing above the Zambezi River. Once they returned to the top, they could receive their next clue.
 This leg's Detour was a choice between Crocs or Canoes. In Crocs, teams had to travel to Crocodile Cage Diving at the Elephants Walk Shopping and Artist Village. Teams had to don wetsuits and were submerged in a metal cage, where they had to use poles to feed meat to three Nile crocodiles before receiving their next clue. In Canoes, teams had to travel to the A'Zambezi River Lodge, where they had to get an inflatable canoe and paddle together across the river. Once they arrived at the island, one team member had to hoist their partner up a tree in order to retrieve their next clue from a nest. Teams then had to paddle back across the river. 
After completing the Detour, teams were instructed to travel to The Lion Encounter at the Masuwe Private Game Reserve. Accompanied by safari instructors and two lions, they walked through the bush to find their next clue hidden in a skull.
At Masuwe Lodge, each team member received a large cloth that was tied around their heads and a basket of fruit that they had to carry on their heads while walking to the nearby pit stop.
Additional notes
Denise & James Earl used their Express Pass to bypass the Detour on this leg.

Leg 6 (Zimbabwe → France)

Episode 6: "My Tongue Doesn't Even Twist That Way" (October 30, 2015)
Locations
Victoria Falls (Masuwe Private Game Reserve – Masuwe Lodge) 
Victoria Falls National Park (Victoria Falls Bridge) 
 Livingstone, Zambia → Paris, France
 Paris → La Ferté-Alais
Cerny (Aérodrome Musée Volant Salis) 
 La Ferté-Alais → Paris
Paris (Montmartre – Square Louise-Michel)
Paris (Port de la Tournelle  La Coupole) 
Paris (Pont Alexandre III)
Paris (Place Charles de Gaulle) 
Episode summary
 In this leg's first Roadblock, one team member had to bungee jump  from the Victoria Falls Bridge. After returning to the top of the bridge, they had to record their heart rate on their fitness watch before receiving their next clue.
After completing the first Roadblock, teams were instructed to fly to Paris, France. Once in Paris, teams had to travel by train to La Ferté-Alais and then make their way to the Aérodrome Musée Volant Salis in Cerny, where they found their next clue.
 In this leg's second Roadblock, the team member who did not perform the previous Roadblock had to fly in a vintage Boeing-Stearman biplane over the French countryside, spot three words on the ground – liberté, égalité, fraternité – and then recite them to a biplane pilot after landing in order to receive their next clue. The team member that flew on the biplane then had to record their heart rate on their fitness watch.
Teams were instructed to return by train to Paris, and then search the Square Louise-Michel beneath the Sacré-Cœur Basilica for Le Fantôme Blanc, who handed them their next clue. 
 This leg's Detour was a choice between Drops Mic or Bust a Crab. In Drops Mic, teams had to travel to the Port de la Tournelle and perform the French rap song "79 à 99" by Passi with correct pronunciation, rhythm, and vibes in order to receive their next clue. In Bust a Crab, teams traveled to La Coupole Restaurant, where they helped to prepare a signature dish – the Royal Platter – by properly shucking and cracking crabs to the chef's standards in order to receive their next clue.
After completing the Detour, teams received a postcard depicting the Pont Alexandre III. There, they found their next clue, which instructed teams to go "across from the iconic monument where the first team will triumph", referring to Place Charles de Gaulle across from the Arc de Triomphe, where teams checked in at the pit stop.
Additional notes
There was no elimination at the end of this leg; all teams were instead instructed to continue racing.

Leg 7 (France → Netherlands)

Episode 7: "Full Speed Ahead, Captain!" (November 6, 2015)
Prize: A cash prize of $31,873 (awarded to Justin and Diana)
Eliminated: Cindy and Rick
Locations
 Paris → Rotterdam, Netherlands
Rotterdam (Leuvehaven  – Lightvessel No. 11 )
 Rotterdam (Kop van Zuid) → Molenwaard (Kinderdijk Windmills) 
Spakenburg
 Schiedam (Nolet Distillery)
 Rotterdam (Millennium Tower  Leuvehoofd ) 
 Rotterdam → The Hague
The Hague (Peace Palace) 
Episode summary
At the start of this leg, teams were instructed to travel by train to Rotterdam, Netherlands. In addition, they received a picture of a ship and had to figure out that their next location was Lightvessel No. 11, docked in Leuvehaven. Teams picked a departure time the next morning and then spent the night on the ship. The next morning, teams took a water taxi to the windmills in Kinderdijk, where they found their next clue.
 In this leg's Roadblock, one team member had to find an exact duplicate of Vincent van Gogh's Sunflowers, placed amongst numerous similar versions with minor differences, located around the nearby windmills in order to receive their next clue.
After completing the Roadblock, teams had to record their highest heart rate from the previous leg and their heart rate from this leg's Roadblock and subtract the difference. The solution determined the number of tulips they had to deliver to the Spakenburgermeisje (the girl at Spakenburg) in order to receive their next clue, which instructed them to take a water taxi to the Nolet Distillery.
 This leg's Detour was a choice between Ship or Skip. For both Detour options, teams had to travel by tram back in Rotterdam. In Ship, teams made their way to the Millennium Tower and used a training simulator that simulated navigating Rotterdam Harbor in stormy weather. The simulation was a two-part mission: teams had to first deliver a pilot to a ship and then go to the aid of a distressed ship. They had to successfully complete the mission within five minutes in order to receive their next clue. In Skip, teams traveled to Leuvehoofd Park and had to complete a 45-second Double Dutch clapping routine on a jump rope in order to receive their next clue.
After completing the Detour, teams had to travel by train to The Hague and then a tram to the pit stop at the Peace Palace.
Additional notes
The cash prize that Justin & Diana received matched the total sum of their footsteps on this leg: $31,873. Fitbit also awarded them an 89-minute massage at the pit stop, which matched the time of the higher heart rate of the pair (Justin) at the end of this leg.

Leg 8 (Netherlands → Poland)

Episode 8: "Krakow, I'm Gonna Get You" (November 13, 2015)
Prize: A trip for two to Shanghai, China (awarded to Justin & Diana)
Locations
The Hague (Peace Palace) 
 The Hague → Amsterdam
 Amsterdam → Kraków, Poland
Kraków (Plaża Kraków)
Wieliczka (Wieliczka Salt Mine)  Kraków (Main Square) 
Kraków (Oskar Schindler Factory)
Kraków (Kazimierz) 
Kraków (Klezmer-Hois) 
Episode summary
At the beginning of this leg, teams were instructed to travel by train to Amsterdam, and then fly to Kraków, Poland. Once in Kraków, teams had to make their way to Plaża Kraków, where one team member had to dive into the swimming pool in order to retrieve their next clue.
 This leg's Detour was a choice between Mine or Music. In Mine, teams made their way to the Wieliczka Salt Mine and descended  into the mine. They then had to carry a large timber support beam to a loading area. After filling a mine cart with salt, teams pushed the cart back through the tunnel to a miner, who gave teams their next clue. In Music, teams traveled to Kraków's Main Square, where they had to choose a professional pianist, learn a musical piece, and then roll a piano through the streets to a performance area. Teams had to perform a duet with a violinist in order to attract donations from passersby. Once they earned 100zł (roughly $25), they could receive their next clue.
After completing the Detour, teams had to travel to the Oskar Schindler Factory, where they were given a tour of the factory. Once they finished the tour, a museum official gave them their next clue.
 In this leg's Roadblock, one team member had to identify seven traditional Jewish dishes on a dinner order from a vast spread and deliver the correct quantity of dishes to a nearby restaurant. If they brought the correct dishes, they could receive their next clue, which directed them to the pit stop inside the restaurant.
Additional notes
This was a non-elimination leg.

Leg 9 (Poland → India)

Episode 9: "It's Always the Quiet Ones" (November 20, 2015)
Prize: A trip for two to Honolulu, Hawaii (awarded to Justin & Diana)
Eliminated: Tanner & Josh
Locations
Kraków (Klezmer-Hois) 
 Kraków → Delhi, India
 New Delhi → Agra
Agra (Yamuna River – Hathi Ghat)  
Agra (Johri Bazar – Hanuman Temple)
Mathura District (Chhata Bazar) 
Agra (Bijli Ghar Chauraha Roundabout) 
Agra (Mehtab Bagh) 
Episode summary
At the beginning of this leg, teams were instructed to fly to Delhi, India, and then travel by train to Agra. Once in Agra, teams had to make their way to Hathi Ghat along the Yamuna River in order to find their next clue.
 In this leg's Roadblock, one team member had to use a bicycle to transport a bundle of Indian saris to the bank of the Yamuna River, where they were shown how to tie them in a traditional manner for washing. Once all of the saris were correctly tied, they had to wash them in a basin, transport them across the beach, and lay them out to dry in order to receive their next clue.
 For their Speed Bump, Tanner & Josh each had to perform the Roadblock, one after the other.
After completing the Roadblock, teams had to travel to the Hanuman Temple in Johri Bazar, where they received a traditional Indian blessing before receiving their next clue.
 This leg's Detour was a choice between Cans or Candy. In Cans, teams had to load and secure 120 metal cooking-oil cans onto a flatbed bicycle and pedal through the crowded streets to the New Taj Oil Company, where they had to unload the cans in order to receive their next clue. In Candy, teams had to cut small pieces from winter melons, which are used to make an Indian candy called petha. Once the pieces weighed in at one maund (90 lbs.), they had to deliver prepackaged petha to the Pancchi Petha Candy Store in order to receive their next clue.
After completing the Detour, teams had to travel to the Bijli Ghar Chauraha Roundabout in order to locate their next clue, which directed teams to travel to the Moonlight Garden – known locally as Mehtab Bagh – across the river from the Taj Mahal, in order to find the pit stop.
Additional notes
 Kelsey & Joey chose to use the U-Turn on Tanner & Josh.

Leg 10 (India)

Episode 10: "Bring the Fun, Baby!" (November 27, 2015)
Prize:  each (awarded to Justin & Diana)
Eliminated: Denise & James Earl
Locations
Agra (Mehtab Bagh) 
Agra (Kachora Bazaar) 
Agra (Shri Raj Complex – Goyal Book Store) 
Agra (Shree Raj Complex  Rajeshwar Mandir) 
Agra (Shree Ramchandra Farm House) 
Episode summary
At the beginning of this leg, teams had to make their way to the Kachora Bazaar in Agra in order to find their next clue.
 In this leg's Roadblock, one team member had to use a pump to inflate enough balloons to fill a net attached to the back of a bicycle. Once the net was full, they had to ride across the congested Yamuna Bridge, deliver the balloons to a wedding planner, receive their next clue, and then bicycle back to reunite with their partner.
After completing the Roadblock, teams had to travel to the Goyal Book Store in order to find their next clue.
 This leg's Detour was a choice between Bring the Groom or Bring the Fun. In Bring the Groom, teams had to hand-crank a portable generator until it produced enough power to light up a cumbersome candelabrum. Teams then had to join a baraat procession through the streets, with one team member carrying the candelabrum while the other carried the generator, escorting a groom to his wedding party at the Shree Ramchandra Farm House in order to receive their next clue. In Bring the Fun, teams had to push a mobile amusement swing through the crowded streets, deliver it to the outside playground at the same wedding party, and give eight children a ride in the swing in order to receive their next clue.
Teams had to check in at the nearby pit stop.
Additional notes
 Justin & Diana chose to use the U-Turn on Logan & Chris.

Leg 11 (India → Hong Kong → Macau)

Episode 11: "It's Not Easy Beating Green" (December 4, 2015)
Prize: A trip for two to Cusco, Peru (awarded to Logan & Chris)
Eliminated: Tiffany & Krista
Locations
Agra (Four Points by Sheraton) 
 Delhi → Hong Kong
Hong Kong (Tsim Sha Tsui – The Peninsula Hong Kong)
Hong Kong (Tsim Sha Tsui – Sam's Tailor & Sam's Workshop  Sham Shui Po – Apliu Street & Kweilin Street) 
 Hong Kong → Macau
Macau (Cotai – City of Dreams Casino & Dancing Water Theater) 
Macau (Sé – Centro Náutico da Praia Grande ) 
Episode summary
At the beginning of this leg, teams were instructed to fly to Hong Kong. Once there, teams had to search outside the airport for a Rolls-Royce limousine, which took them to The Peninsula Hong Kong, where teams found their next clue.
 This season's final Detour was a choice between Sam's or Cells. In Sam's, teams traveled to Sam's Tailor, where they picked up measurements for a suit jacket. Teams then headed to Sam's Workshop to properly cut out six template pieces of a matching design. They then had to deliver a finished suit back to Sam's Tailor in order to receive their next clue. In Cells, teams traveled to a marked store on the crowded Apliu Street and searched through boxes of used cell phones to find one that turned on. After dialing a number displayed on the phone, a message instructed them to travel to Kong Wah Telecom (HK) Limited on Kweilin Street in order to find their next clue.
After completing the Detour, teams had to travel by ferry to Macau. Teams then had to make their way to the City of Dreams Casino and search for a performer named Iago, who gave them their next clue.
 In this leg's Roadblock, one team member had to participate in a performance of The House of Dancing Water. Once they found the fish, they had to swim across the pool and deliver it to a fisherman on a raft in exchange for their next clue. If they could not complete the task before the music stopped, they had to wait twenty minutes for the next performance in order to try again.
Teams had to check in at the pit stop: the Centro Náutico da Praia Grande, overlooking Nam Van Lake in Macau.

Leg 12 (Hong Kong → United States)

Episode 12: "We Got a Chance, Baby!" (December 11, 2015)
Winners: Kelsey & Joey
Second Place: Justin & Diana
Third Place: Logan & Chris
Locations
Hong Kong (Admiralty – Conrad Hong Kong) 
 Hong Kong → New York City, New York
New York City (Randall's Island – FDNY Fire Academy) 
 Elmont (Belmont Park) → Southampton (Southampton Heliport)
Southampton (Shinnecock East County Park)
 Southampton (Shinnecock Bay)
Southampton (Cooper's Beach)
Southampton (1620 Meadow Lane) 
Episode summary
At the beginning of this leg, teams were instructed to fly to New York City. Once there, teams had to travel to the FDNY Fire Academy at Randall's Island in order to find their next clue.
 In this season's final Roadblock, one team member had to don a New York City Fire Department uniform and take part in a training exercise. They first had to carry a fire hose to a fire engine, and then climb a ladder to the open window of a burning building, where they had to search inside for a dummy. Once they exited the building with the dummy, they had to place it onto a waiting stretcher. The second part of the Roadblock was a memory task in which they had to arrange firefighters' helmets, each labeled with the capital cities of the countries they'd visited, in chronological order, in order to receive their next clue.
{| class="wikitable unsortable" style="text-align:center;"
! scope="col" |Country
! scope="col" |Capital
|-
! scope="row" | Brazil
| Brasília
|-
! scope="row" | Argentina
| Buenos Aires
|-
! scope="row" | Zambia
| Lusaka
|-
! scope="row" | Zimbabwe
| Harare
|-
! scope="row" | France
| Paris
|-
! scope="row" | Netherlands
| Amsterdam
|-
! scope="row" | Poland
| Warsaw
|-
! scope="row" | India
| New Delhi
|-
! scope="row" | China
| Beijing
|}
After completing the Roadblock, teams were instructed to travel to the location of the final race of the Triple Crown: Belmont Park. There, teams traveled by helicopter to Southampton in the Hamptons. After landing at Southampton Heliport, they had to search for their next clue, which directed them to Shinnecock East County Park. Teams had to drive a Sea-Doo to a lobster boat, where they had to pull seven lobster traps from the water, empty them, and replace them with new traps. Once this was completed, teams received a box containing the flags of all of the countries they'd visited (along with one decoy flag), which they had to arrange in chronological order in order to receive their next clue and head back to shore.
{| class="wikitable unsortable" style="text-align:left;"
! scope="col" |Order
! scope="col" |Flag
|-
! scope="row" | 1
| 
|-
! scope="row" | 2
| 
|-
! scope="row" | 3
| 
|-
! scope="row" | 4
| 
|-
! scope="row" | 5
| 
|-
! scope="row" | 6
| 
|-
! scope="row" | 7
| 
|-
! scope="row" | 8
| 
|-
! scope="row" | 9
| 
|-
! scope="row" | 10
| 
|}
When the lobster boats neared the shore, teams had to swim to shore and drive a dune buggy down the beach to their third memory challenge. They had to properly assemble six Adirondack chairs painted with objects encountered during the season and arrange them in chronological order – water bike, tango dancers, lion, windmill, Taj Mahal, and Rolls-Royce – in order to receive their final clue, which directed teams to travel on foot to the nearby finish line.

Reception

Critical response
The Amazing Race 27 received mixed reviews. Jodi Walker of Entertainment Weekly called this season "a pretty odd season of The Amazing Race." Whitney McIntosh of Uproxx called this season "subpar at best, with many of the teams boring audiences or just completely botching the race tasks altogether." Luke Gelineau of TV Equals called it "one of the most frustrating seasons in recent memory, with some of the dumbest and most clueless teams in Race history". In 2016, this season was ranked 19th out of the first 27 seasons by the Rob Has a Podcast Amazing Race correspondents.

Ratings
U.S. Nielsen ratings

Canadian ratings
Canadian broadcaster CTV also airs The Amazing Race on Fridays. Episodes air at 8:00 p.m. Eastern and Central (9:00 p.m. Pacific, Mountain and Atlantic).

Canadian DVR ratings are included in Numeris's count.

References

External links

 27
Amazing Race 27, The
Television shows filmed in California
Television shows filmed in Brazil
Television shows filmed in Argentina
Television shows filmed in Zambia
Television shows filmed in Zimbabwe
Television shows filmed in France
Television shows filmed in the Netherlands
Television shows filmed in Poland
Television shows filmed in India
Television shows filmed in Hong Kong
Television shows filmed in Macau
Television shows filmed in New York (state)